Kunzler can refer to:

Künzler, a surname
Kunzler & Company, Inc., American food company